Hanna Volodymyrivna Bezulyk ( born 13 May 1971) is a Ukrainian television host.

References

1971 births
Living people
Taras Shevchenko National University of Kyiv alumni
Television presenters from Kyiv
Recipients of the Order of Princess Olga, 3rd class